Live to Die may refer to:

 Live to Die (Intruder album), 1987
 Live to Die (Bride album), 1988